{{automatic taxobox
|image = MW001-good 022-new.jpg
|image_caption = Sulfolobus
|taxon = TACK group
|authority = Guy & Ettema 2011
| subdivision_ranks = Phyla
| subdivision_ref = 
| subdivision = 
 "Aigarchaeota"
 "Bathyarchaeota"
 Thermoproteota
 "Gearchaeota"
 "Geothermarchaeota"
 "Korarchaeota"
 "Marsarchaeota"
 Nitrososphaerota
 "Verstraetearchaeota"
|synonyms = 
 Crenarchaeota <small>Garrity & Holt 2002</small>
 "Eocyta" Lake et al. 1984
 "Filarchaeota" Cavalier-Smith 2014
}}

TACK is a group of archaea acronym for Thaumarchaeota (now Nitrososphaerota), Aigarchaeota, Crenarchaeota (now Thermoproteota), and Korarchaeota, the first groups discovered. They are found in different environments ranging from acidophilic thermophiles to mesophiles and psychrophiles and with different types of metabolism, predominantly anaerobic and chemosynthetic. TACK is a clade that is close to the branch that gave rise to the eukaryotes. It has been proposed that the TACK clade be classified as Crenarchaeota and that the traditional "Crenarchaeota" (Thermoproteota) be classified as a class called "Sulfolobia", along with the other phyla with class rank or order.

 Classification 

 Thermoproteota (formerly Crenarchaeota). It is the best known edge and the most abundant archaea in the marine ecosystem. They were previously called sulfobacteria because of their dependence on sulfur and are important as carbon fixers. There are hyperthermophiles in hydrothermal vents and other groups are the most abundant at depths of less than 100 m.
 "Aigarchaeota". It is a phylum proposed from the genome of the candidate species Caldiarchaeum'' subterraneum found deep within a gold mine in Japan. Genomic sequences of this group have also been found in geothermal environments, both terrestrial and marine.
 "Geoarchaeota". It includes thermophilic organisms that live in acidic environments reducing ferric iron. Alternatively it has been proposed that this and earlier group actually belong to the phylum Nitrososphaerota.
 Nitrososphaerota (formerly Thaumarchaeota). It includes mesophilic or psychrophilic organisms (medium and low temperatures), of ammonia-oxidant chemolytoautotrophic metabolism (nitrifying) and that can play an important role in biochemical cycles, such as the nitrogen and carbon cycles.
 "Bathyarchaeota". It is abundant in the sediments of the seabed with a shortage of nutrients. At least some lineages develop through homoacetogenesis, a type of metabolism hitherto thought unique to bacteria.
 "Korarchaeota". They have only been found in hydrothermal environments and in low abundance. They seem diversified at different phylogenetic levels according to temperature, salinity (fresh or marine water) and geography.

Phylogeny 
The relationships are roughly as follows:

Eocyte hypothesis
The eocyte hypothesis proposed in the 1980s by James Lake suggests that eukaryotes emerged within the prokaryotic eocytes.

One possible piece of evidence supporting a close relationship between TACK and eukaryotes is the presence of a homolog of the RNA polymerase subunit Rbp-8 in Thermoproteota but not in Euryarchaea

See also
 List of Archaea genera

References 

Archaea